Cyril Raymond Howard Shaw (born 1934) is a British teacher and writer, specialising in crime fiction.  He is a former head of history at Harrow School.

Shaw was born in Bristol, and educated at Taunton School and at Queen's College, Oxford, where he read modern history. He was commissioned in the Royal Artillery during his national service after which he taught at Harrow School from 1961-1997. In 1966, Shaw was elected a schoolmaster fellow of Emmanuel College, Cambridge.

In 1968, Shaw produced The Levellers in the Seminar Studies in History series.  He has subsequently written a number of well-received works of mystery fiction, published initially under the pseudonym "Colin Howard", drawing on his knowledge of the English public school and the Oxford University college. Death of a Don (1982) was a Mystery Guild selection, and was later re-published in the U.K. in the Black Dagger Crime series. Of the book, Christopher Wordsworth commented "Cambridge may incubate the best traitors but Oxford can pride itself on fiction's best corpses".

Selected publications
The Levellers. Longman, London, 1968. (Seminar Studies in History) 
Killing No Murder. Scribner, New York, 1981. 
Death of a Don. Hodder & Stoughton, London, 1982. 
Thomas Hardy: An Autobiography in Verse. Shepheard-Walwyn, 1984. (With Eliane Wilson) 
Pageant of Death. Offa Press, Harrow on the Hill, 2000.  
Betrayal in Burgundy. Matador, Leicester, 2013.

References

External links 
Assistant Masters at Harrow School.

British non-fiction writers
British writers
Schoolteachers from Somerset
People educated at Taunton School
Alumni of The Queen's College, Oxford
Royal Artillery officers
1934 births
Living people